"Horror Head" is the second single from the debut studio album Doppelgänger by alternative rock band Curve. It was released on 6 July 1992 it reached #31 in the UK singles chart. It is one of their most popular songs.

Track listing

12" & CD
"Horror Head" (remix) – 3:40
"Falling Free" – 4:22
"Mission From God" – 4:07
"Today Is Not the Day" – 3:44

MC
"Horror Head" (remix) – 3:40
"Mission From God" – 4:07

Music video
The video for "Horror Head" features members of the band performing this song. It is full of fast colour changes. Toni Halliday is showing some Indian symbols in this clip and is swimming in the blurred water.

Credits
 Written by Toni Halliday and Dean Garcia
 "Horror Head" (remix) produced by Curve & Flood and remixed by Alan Moulder at The Church
 Tracks 2, 3, 4 produced by Curve and mixed by Alan Moulder at Todal
 Design and photography: Flat Earth

Charts

References

1992 singles
Curve (band) songs
Song recordings produced by Flood (producer)
1992 songs
Songs written by Dean Garcia
Songs written by Toni Halliday